Daerah Belait Library (officially ) is a public library located in Kuala Belait, Brunei.

History 
The library was established on 14 July 1975, initially located at Jalan Bunga Raya. It moved to the present building at Jalan Padang in 1986, which was inaugurated by Princess Masna on 19 June in that year.

References 

Dewan Bahasa dan Pustaka Library
Libraries in Brunei
Belait District
Libraries established in 1975
1975 establishments in Brunei